Pseudonemophas versteegi is a species of beetle in the family Cerambycidae. It was described by Ritsema in 1881, originally under the genus Monochamus. It is known from India, Sumatra, Myanmar, Laos, Thailand, Malaysia, Vietnam, and China. It contains the varietas Pseudonemophas versteegi var. albescens.

References

Lamiini
Beetles described in 1881